The Strangest Secret was a 1956 spoken word record by Earl Nightingale, which sold over one million copies and received the first Gold Record for the spoken word, which helped launch the fields of business motivation and audio publishing. It was later adapted into print and video forms.

Origin
In 1950, Earl Nightingale was inspired by the words "we become what we think about" in Napoleon Hill's book Think and Grow Rich around the same time he bought an insurance agency. He provided weekly motivational speeches to the agency's sales staff. In 1956, he recorded a motivational speech to be played while he was on vacation. Nightingale's employees spread word of the speech, and demand for the recording grew so large that he and friend Lloyd Conant formed the Nightingale-Conant Corporation to manage sales.

Content
The audio recording was later adapted into print form as a short, 44-page essay. The teachings focus on nonconformity and self-education, and summarizes that "You are now, and you do become, what you think about."

In other media
Nightingale's recording has been redistributed in various mediums since its initial release. In 2018 Janice Bryant Howroyd released an updated version with her edits and enhancements, read from a female perspective.

References

Business books
Self-help books
1957 non-fiction books
1956 EPs